Foshchevatoye is a rural locality (a selo) in Korochansky District, Belgorod Oblast, Russia. The population was 190 as of 2010. There are 5 streets.

Geography 
Foshchevatoye is located 14 km southeast of Korocha (the district's administrative centre) by road. Krasny is the nearest rural locality.

References 

Rural localities in Korochansky District